Linio is one of the leading marketplaces in Latin America, with presence in five countries and offering more than four million products.

History 

Linio began operations in 2012 in Mexico.

The company has been through various rounds of funding, including one that concluded in September 2016.

On 1 August 2018, the company was acquired by the Chilean retail store Falabella for USD$138 million.

References 

Online retailers of Mexico